Minuscule 312 (in the Gregory-Aland numbering), α 187 (Soden), is a Greek minuscule manuscript of the New Testament, on parchment. Palaeographically it has been assigned to the 11th century. 
Formerly it was labelled by 22a and 75p. 
It has marginalia.

Description 

The codex contains the text of the Acts of the Apostles, Catholic epistles, and Pauline epistles on 145 + 172 parchment leaves with lacunae (Acts 1:1-11; 3:16-4:2; Hebrews 6:7-7:1). It is written in one column per page, in 22 lines per page.

Lectionary markings at the margin were added by a later hand.

Kurt Aland did not place the text of this codex in any Category.

History 

Formerly the manuscript belonged to the monastery Constantos, then to Richard Mead. Wettstein saw it in 1746 in London. It was examined by Askew, Griesbach, Bloomfeld, and Gregory. 
Griesbach collated its text in Pauline epistles. C. R. Gregory saw it in 1883. Formerly it was labelled by 22a and 75p. In 1908 Gregory gave number 312 for it.

The manuscript is currently housed at the British Library (Add MS 5115-5116) in London.

See also 

 List of New Testament minuscules
 Biblical manuscript
 Textual criticism

References

Further reading 

 

Greek New Testament minuscules
11th-century biblical manuscripts
British Library additional manuscripts